Keser is a Turkish surname. Notable people with the surname include:

 Erdal Keser (born 1961), Turkish footballer
 Gökhan Keser (born 1987), Turkish model, actor, and singer
 İbrahim Halil Keser (born 1997), Turkish footballer
 Polat Keser (born 1985), German-born Turkish footballer

Turkish-language surnames